The Canary Islands, also known informally as the Canaries, are a Spanish autonomous community and archipelago in Macaronesia in the Atlantic Ocean. They are the southernmost of the autonomous communities of Spain. The islands have a population of 2.2 million people and are the most populous special territory of the European Union.

The seven main islands are (from largest to smallest in area) Tenerife, Fuerteventura, Gran Canaria, Lanzarote, La Palma, La Gomera, and El Hierro. The archipelago includes many smaller islands and islets, including La Graciosa, Alegranza, Isla de Lobos, Montaña Clara, Roque del Oeste, and Roque del Este. It also includes a number of rocks, including Garachico and Anaga. In ancient times, the island chain was often referred to as "the Fortunate Isles". The Canary Islands are the southernmost region of Spain, and the largest and most populous archipelago of Macaronesia. Because of their location, the Canary Islands have historically been considered a link between the four continents of Africa, North America, South America, and Europe.

In 2019, the Canary Islands had a population of 2,153,389, with a density of 287.39 inhabitants per km2, making it the eighth most populous autonomous community of Spain. The population is mostly concentrated in the two capital islands: around 43% on the island of Tenerife and 40% on the island of Gran Canaria.

The Canary Islands, especially Tenerife, Gran Canaria, Fuerteventura, and Lanzarote, are a major tourist destination, with over 12 million visitors per year. This is due to their beaches, subtropical climate, and important natural attractions, especially Maspalomas in Gran Canaria and Mount Teide (a World Heritage Site) in Tenerife. Mount Teide is the highest peak in Spain and the third tallest volcano in the world, measured from its base on the ocean floor. The islands have warm summers and winters warm enough for the climate to be technically tropical at sea level. The amount of precipitation and the level of maritime moderation vary depending on location and elevation. The archipelago includes green areas as well as desert. The islands' high mountains are ideal for astronomical observation, because they lie above the temperature inversion layer. As a result, the archipelago boasts two professional observatories: the Teide Observatory on Tenerife, and Roque de los Muchachos Observatory on La Palma.

In 1927, the Province of Canary Islands was split into two provinces. In 1982, the autonomous community of the Canary Islands was established. The cities of Santa Cruz de Tenerife and Las Palmas de Gran Canaria are, jointly, the capitals of the islands. Those cities are also, respectively, the capitals of the provinces of Santa Cruz de Tenerife and Las Palmas. Las Palmas de Gran Canaria has been the largest city in the Canaries since 1768, except for a brief period in the 1910s. Between the 1833 territorial division of Spain and 1927, Santa Cruz de Tenerife was the sole capital of the Canary Islands. In 1927, it was ordered by decree that the capital of the Canary Islands would be shared between two cities, and this arrangement persists to the present day. The third largest city in the Canary Islands is San Cristóbal de La Laguna (another World Heritage Site) on Tenerife. 

During the Age of Sail, the islands were the main stopover for Spanish galleons during the Spanish colonisation of the Americas, which sailed that far south in order to catch the prevailing northeasterly trade winds.

Etymology 
The name Islas Canarias is likely derived from the Latin name Canariae Insulae, meaning "Islands of the Dogs", a name that was evidently generalized from the ancient name of one of these islands, Canaria – presumably Gran Canaria. According to the historian Pliny the Elder, the island Canaria contained "vast multitudes of dogs of very large size".

Other theories speculate that the name comes from the Nukkari Berber tribe living in the Moroccan Atlas, named in Roman sources as Canarii, though Pliny again mentions the relation of this term with dogs. The connection to dogs is retained in their depiction on the islands' coat-of-arms. It is thought that the aborigines of Gran Canaria called themselves "Canarios". It is possible that after being conquered, this name was used in plural in Spanish, i.e., as to refer to all of the islands as the Canarii-as.

The name of the islands is not derived from the canary bird; rather, the birds are named after the islands.

Physical geography 

Tenerife is the largest and most populous island of the archipelago. Gran Canaria, with 865,070 inhabitants, is both the Canary Islands' second most populous island, and the third most populous one in Spain after Tenerife (966,354 inhabitants) and Majorca (896,038 inhabitants).

The islands form the Macaronesia ecoregion with the Azores, Cape Verde, Madeira, and the Savage Isles. The Canary Islands is the largest and most populated archipelago of the Macaronesia region. The archipelago consists of seven large and several smaller islands, all of which are volcanic in origin.

According to the position of the islands with respect to the north-east trade winds, the climate can be mild and wet or very dry. Several native species form laurisilva forests.

As a consequence, the individual islands in the Canary archipelago tend to have distinct microclimates. Those islands such as El Hierro, La Palma and La Gomera lying to the west of the archipelago have a climate which is influenced by the moist Canary Current. They are well vegetated even at low levels and have extensive tracts of sub-tropical laurisilva forest. As one travels east toward the African coast, the influence of the current diminishes, and the islands become increasingly arid. Fuerteventura and Lanzarote, the islands which are closest to the African mainland, are effectively desert or semi desert. Gran Canaria is known as a "continent in miniature" for its diverse landscapes like Maspalomas and Roque Nublo. In terms of its climate Tenerife is particularly interesting. The north of the island lies under the influence of the moist Atlantic winds and is well vegetated, while the south of the island around the tourist resorts of Playa de las Américas and Los Cristianos is arid. Many of the plant species in the Canary Islands, like the Canary Island pine and the dragon tree, Dracaena draco are endemic, as noted by Sabin Berthelot and Philip Barker Webb in their work, L'Histoire Naturelle des Îles Canaries (1835–50).

Climate 
The climate is warm subtropical and generally semidesertic, moderated by the sea and in summer by the trade winds. There are a number of microclimates and the classifications range mainly from semi-arid to desert. According to Köppen, the majority of the Canary Islands have a hot desert climate (BWh) and a hot semi-arid climate (BSh), caused partly due to the cool Canary Current. There also exists a subtropical humid climate which is very influenced by the ocean in the middle of the islands of La Gomera, Tenerife and La Palma, where laurisilva cloud forests grow.

Geology 

The seven major islands, one minor island, and several small islets were originally volcanic islands, formed by the Canary hotspot. The Canary Islands is the only place in Spain where volcanic eruptions have been recorded during the Modern Era, with some volcanoes still active (El Hierro, 2011).
Volcanic islands such as those in the Canary chain often have steep ocean cliffs caused by catastrophic debris avalanches and landslides. The island chain's most recent eruption occurred at Cumbre Vieja, a volcanic ridge on La Palma, in 2021.

The Teide volcano on Tenerife is the highest mountain in Spain, and the third tallest volcano on Earth on a volcanic ocean island. All the islands except La Gomera have been active in the last million years; four of them (Lanzarote, Tenerife, La Palma and El Hierro) have historical records of eruptions since European discovery. The islands rise from Jurassic oceanic crust associated with the opening of the Atlantic. Underwater magmatism commenced during the Cretaceous, and continued to the present day. The current islands reached the ocean's surface during the Miocene. The islands were once considered as a distinct physiographic section of the Atlas Mountains province, which in turn is part of the larger African Alpine System division, but are nowadays recognized as being related to a magmatic hot spot.

In the summer of 2011 a series of low-magnitude earthquakes occurred beneath El Hierro. These had a linear trend of northeast–southwest. This eruption produced gases and pumice, but no explosive activity was reported.

The following table shows the highest mountains in each of the islands:

Natural symbols 

The official natural symbols associated with Canary Islands are the bird Serinus canaria (canary) and the Phoenix canariensis palm.

National parks 

Four of Spain's thirteen national parks are located in the Canary Islands, more than any other autonomous community. Two of these have been declared UNESCO World Heritage Sites and the other two are part of Biosphere Reserves. The parks are:

Teide National Park is the oldest and largest national park in the Canary Islands and one of the oldest in Spain. Located in the geographic centre of the island of Tenerife, it is the most visited national park in Spain. In 2010, it became the most visited national park in Europe and second worldwide. In 2007, the Teide National Park was declared one of the 12 Treasures of Spain.

Politics

Governance
The regional executive body, the Parliament of the Canary Islands, is presided over by Ángel Víctor Torres (PSOE), the current President of the Canary Islands. The latter is invested by the members of the regional legislature, the Parliament of the Canary Islands, that consists of 70 elected legislators. The last regional election took place in May 2019.

The islands have 14 seats in the Spanish Senate. Of these, 11 seats are directly elected (3 for Gran Canaria, 3 for Tenerife, and 1 each for Lanzarote (including La Graciosa), Fuerteventura, La Palma, La Gomera and El Hierro) while the other 3 are appointed by the regional legislature.

Political geography 
The Autonomous Community of the Canary Islands consists of two provinces (provincias), Las Palmas and Santa Cruz de Tenerife, whose capitals (Las Palmas de Gran Canaria and Santa Cruz de Tenerife) are capitals of the autonomous community. Each of the seven major islands is ruled by an island council named Cabildo Insular. Each island is subdivided into smaller municipalities (municipios); Las Palmas is divided into 34 municipalities, and Santa Cruz de Tenerife is divided into 54 municipalities.

The international boundary of the Canaries is one subject of dispute in the Morocco-Spain relations. Moreover, in 2022 the UN has declared the Canary Island's territorial waters as Moroccan coast and Morocco has authorised gas and oil exploration in what the Canary Islands states to be Canarian territorial waters and Western Sahara waters. Morocco's official position is that international laws regarding territorial limits do not authorise Spain to claim seabed boundaries based on the territory of the Canaries, since the Canary Islands enjoy a large degree of autonomy. In fact, the islands do not enjoy any special degree of autonomy as each one of the Spanish regions is considered an autonomous community with equal status to the European ones.

Canarian nationalism

There are some pro-independence political parties, like the National Congress of the Canaries (CNC) and the Popular Front of the Canary Islands, but their popular support is almost insignificant, with no presence in either the autonomous parliament or the cabildos insulares. According to a 2012 study by the Centro de Investigaciones Sociológicas, when asked about national identity, the majority of respondents from the Canary Islands (53.8%) consider themselves Spanish and Canarian in equal measures, followed by 24% who consider themselves more Canarian than Spanish. Only 6.1% of the respondents consider themselves only Canarian while 7% consider themselves only Spanish.

Defence

The defence of the territory is the responsibility of the Spanish Armed Forces. As such, various components of the Army, Navy, Air Force and the Civil Guard are based in the territory.

History

Ancient and pre-Hispanic times 

Before the arrival of humans, the Canaries were inhabited by prehistoric animals; for example, the giant lizard (Gallotia goliath), the Tenerife and Gran Canaria giant rats, and giant prehistoric tortoises, Geochelone burchardi and Geochelone vulcanica.

Although the original settlement of what are now called the Canary Islands is not entirely clear, linguistic, genetic, and archaeological analyses indicate that indigenous peoples were living on the Canary Islands at least 2000 years ago but possibly one thousand years or more before, and that they shared a common origin with the Berbers on the nearby North African coast. Reaching the islands may have taken place using several small boats, landing on the easternmost islands Lanzarote and Fuerteventura. These groups came to be known collectively as the Guanches, although Guanches had been the name for only the indigenous inhabitants of Tenerife.

As José Farrujia describes, 'The indigenous Canarians lived mainly in natural caves, usually near the coast, 300-500m above sea level. These caves were sometimes isolated but more commonly formed settlements, with burial caves nearby'. Archaeological work has uncovered a rich culture visible through artefacts of ceramics, human figures, fishing, hunting and farming tools, plant fibre clothing and vessels, as well as cave paintings. At Lomo de los Gatos on Gran Canaria, a site occupied from 1,600 years ago up until the 1960s, round stone houses, complex burial sites, and associated artefacts have been found. Across the islands are thousands of Libyco-Berber alphabet inscriptions scattered and they have been extensively documented by many linguists.

The social structure of indigenous Canarians encompassed 'a system of matrilineal descent in most of the islands, in which inheritance was passed on via the female line. Social status and wealth were hereditary and determined the individual's position in the social pyramid, which consisted of the king, the relatives of the king, the lower nobility, villeins, plebeians, and finally executioners, butchers, embalmers, and prisoners'. Their religion was animist, centring on the sun and moon, as well as natural features such as mountains.

Exploration

The islands may have been visited by the Phoenicians, the Greeks, and the Carthaginians. King Juba II, Caesar Augustus's Numidian protégé, is credited with discovering the islands for the Western world. According to Pliny the Elder, Juba found the islands uninhabited, but found "a small temple of stone" and "some traces of buildings". Juba dispatched a naval contingent to re-open the dye production facility at Mogador in what is now western Morocco in the early first century AD. That same naval force was subsequently sent on an exploration of the Canary Islands, using Mogador as their mission base.

The names given by Romans to the individual islands were Ninguaria or Nivaria (Tenerife), Canaria (Gran Canaria), Pluvialia or Invale (Lanzarote), Ombrion (La Palma), Planasia (Fuerteventura), Iunonia or Junonia (El Hierro) and Capraria (La Gomera).

From the 14th century onward, numerous visits were made by sailors from Majorca, Portugal and Genoa. Lancelotto Malocello settled on Lanzarote in 1312. The Majorcans established a mission with a bishop in the islands that lasted from 1350 to 1400.

Castilian conquest 

In 1402, the Castilian colonisation of the islands began with the expedition of the French explorers Jean de Béthencourt and Gadifer de la Salle, nobles and vassals of Henry III of Castile, to Lanzarote. From there, they went on to conquer Fuerteventura (1405) and El Hierro. These invasions were 'brutal cultural and military clashes between the indigenous population and the Castilians' lasting over a century due to formidable resistance by indigenous Canarians. Professor Mohamed Adhikari has defined the conquest of the islands as a genocide of the Guanches.

Béthencourt received the title King of the Canary Islands, but still recognised King Henry III as his overlord. It was not a simple military enterprise, given the aboriginal resistance on some islands. Neither was it politically, since the particular interests of the nobility (determined to strengthen their economic and political power through the acquisition of the islands) conflicted with those of the states, particularly Castile, which were in the midst of territorial expansion and in a process of strengthening of the Crown against the nobility.

Historians distinguish two periods in the conquest of the Canary Islands:

Aristocratic conquest (Conquista señorial). This refers to the early conquests carried out by the nobility, for their own benefit and without the direct participation of the Crown of Castile, which merely granted rights of conquest in exchange for pacts of vassalage between the noble conqueror and the Crown. One can identify within this period an early phase known as the Betancurian or Norman Conquest, carried out by Jean de Bethencourt (who was originally from Normandy) and Gadifer de la Salle between 1402 and 1405, which involved the islands of Lanzarote, El Hierro and Fuerteventura. The subsequent phase is known as the Castilian Conquest, carried out by Castilian nobles who acquired, through purchases, assignments and marriages, the previously conquered islands and also incorporated the island of La Gomera around 1450.

Royal conquest (Conquista realenga). This defines the conquest between 1478 and 1496, carried out directly by the Crown of Castile, during the reign of the Catholic Monarchs, who armed and partly financed the conquest of those islands which were still unconquered: Gran Canaria, La Palma and Tenerife. This phase of the conquest came to an end in the year 1496, with the dominion of the island of Tenerife, bringing the entire Canarian Archipelago under the control of the Crown of Castile.

Béthencourt also established a base on the island of La Gomera, but it would be many years before the island was fully conquered. The natives of La Gomera, and of Gran Canaria, Tenerife, and La Palma, resisted the Castilian invaders for almost a century. In 1448 Maciot de Béthencourt sold the lordship of Lanzarote to Portugal's Prince Henry the Navigator, an action that was accepted by neither the natives nor the Castilians. Despite Pope Nicholas V ruling that the Canary Islands were under Portuguese control, the crisis swelled to a revolt which lasted until 1459 with the final expulsion of the Portuguese. In 1479, Portugal and Castile signed the Treaty of Alcáçovas, which settled disputes between Castile and Portugal over the control of the Atlantic. This treaty recognized Castilian control of the Canary Islands but also confirmed Portuguese possession of the Azores, Madeira, and the Cape Verde islands, and gave the Portuguese rights to any further islands or lands in the Atlantic that might be discovered.

The Castilians continued to dominate the islands, but due to the topography and the resistance of the native Guanches, they did not achieve complete control until 1496, when Tenerife and La Palma were finally subdued by Alonso Fernández de Lugo. As a result of this 'the native pre-Hispanic population declined quickly due to war, epidemics, and slavery'. The Canaries were incorporated into the Kingdom of Castile.

After the conquest and the introduction of slavery 

After the conquest, the Castilians imposed a new economic model, based on single-crop cultivation: first sugarcane; then wine, an important item of trade with England. Gran Canaria was conquered by the Crown of Castile on 6 March 1480, and Tenerife was conquered in 1496, and each had its own governor. There has been speculation that the abundance of Roccella tinctoria on the Canary Islands offered a profit motive for Jean de Béthencourt during his conquest of the islands. Lichen has been used for centuries to make dyes. This includes royal purple colors derived from roccella tinctoria, also known as orseille.

The objective of the Spanish Crown to convert the islands into a powerhouse of cultivation required a much larger labour force. This was attained through a brutal practice of enslavement, not only of indigenous Canarians but large numbers of Africans who were forcibly taken from North and Sub-Saharan Africa. Whilst the first slave plantations in the Atlantic region were across Madeira, Cape Verde, and the Canary Islands, it was only the Canary Islands which had an indigenous population and were therefore invaded rather than newly occupied.

This agriculture industry was largely based on sugarcane and the Castilians converted large swaths of the landscape for sugarcane production, and the processing and manufacturing of sugar, facilitated by enslaved labourers. The cities of Santa Cruz de Tenerife and Las Palmas de Gran Canaria became a stopping point for the Spanish traders, as well as conquistadors, and missionaries on their way to the New World. This trade route brought great wealth to the Castilian social sectors of the islands and soon were attracting merchants and adventurers from all over Europe. As the wealth grew, enslaved African workers were also forced into demeaning domestic roles for the rich Castilians on the islands such as servants in their houses. Research on the skeletons of some of these enslaved workers from the burial site of Finca Clavijo on Gran Canaria have showed that 'all of the adults buried in Finca Clavijo undertook extensive physical activity that involved significant stress on the spine and appendicular skeleton' that result from relentless hard labour, akin to the physical abnormalities found with enslaved peoples from other sugarcane plantations around the world. These findings of the physical strain that the enslaved at Finca Clavijo were subjected to in order to provide wealth for the Spanish elite has inspired a poem by British writer Ralph Hoyte, entitled Close to the Bone.

The method of forcibly relocating Africans to the Canary Islands in order to provide intensive labour, the first time this had been attempted, was looked at favourably by other European powers and was the inspiration behind the Transatlantic Slave Trade whereby around 12 million Africans were taken from their homelands in order to enter forced labour as plantation workers and domestic servants in the Americas over a period of 400 years.

As a result of the huge wealth generated by enslaved labour, magnificent palaces and churches were built on La Palma during this busy, prosperous period. The Church of El Salvador survives as one of the island's finest examples of the architecture of the 16th century. Civilian architecture survives in forms such as Casas de los Sánchez-Ochando or Casa Quintana.

The Canaries' wealth invited attacks by pirates and privateers. Ottoman Turkish admiral and privateer Kemal Reis ventured into the Canaries in 1501, while Murat Reis the Elder captured Lanzarote in 1585.

The most severe attack took place in 1599, during the Dutch Revolt. A Dutch fleet of 74 ships and 12,000 men, commanded by Pieter van der Does, attacked the capital Las Palmas de Gran Canaria (the city had 3,500 of Gran Canaria's 8,545 inhabitants). The Dutch attacked the Castillo de la Luz, which guarded the harbor. The Canarians evacuated civilians from the city, and the Castillo surrendered (but not the city). The Dutch moved inland, but Canarian cavalry drove them back to Tamaraceite, near the city.

The Dutch then laid siege to the city, demanding the surrender of all its wealth. They received 12 sheep and 3 calves. Furious, the Dutch sent 4,000 soldiers to attack the Council of the Canaries, who were sheltering in the village of Santa Brígida. 300 Canarian soldiers ambushed the Dutch in the village of Monte Lentiscal, killing 150 and forcing the rest to retreat. The Dutch concentrated on Las Palmas de Gran Canaria, attempting to burn it down. The Dutch pillaged Maspalomas, on the southern coast of Gran Canaria, San Sebastián on La Gomera, and Santa Cruz on La Palma, but eventually gave up the siege of Las Palmas and withdrew.

In 1618 the Barbary pirates from North Africa attacked Lanzarote and La Gomera taking 1000 captives to be sold as slaves. Another noteworthy attack occurred in 1797, when Santa Cruz de Tenerife was attacked by a British fleet under Horatio Nelson on 25 July. The British were repulsed, losing almost 400 men. It was during this battle that Nelson lost his right arm.

18th to 19th century 

The sugar-based economy of the islands faced stiff competition from Spain's Caribbean colonies. Low sugar prices in the 19th century caused severe recessions on the islands. A new cash crop, cochineal (cochinilla), came into cultivation during this time, reinvigorating the islands' economy. During this time the Canarian-American trade was developed, in which Canarian products such as cochineal, sugarcane and rum were sold in American ports such as Veracruz, Campeche, La Guaira and Havana, among others.

By the end of the 18th century, Canary Islanders had already emigrated to Spanish American territories, such as Havana, Veracruz, and Santo Domingo, San Antonio, Texas and St. Bernard Parish, Louisiana. These economic difficulties spurred mass emigration during the 19th and first half of the 20th century, primarily to the Americas. Between 1840 and 1890 as many as 40,000 Canary Islanders emigrated to Venezuela. Also, thousands of Canarians moved to Puerto Rico where the Spanish monarchy felt that Canarians would adapt to island life better than other immigrants from the mainland of Spain. Deeply entrenched traditions, such as the Mascaras Festival in the town of Hatillo, Puerto Rico, are an example of Canarian culture still preserved in Puerto Rico. Similarly, many thousands of Canarians emigrated to the shores of Cuba. During the Spanish–American War of 1898, the Spanish fortified the islands against a possible American attack, but no such event took place.

Romantic period and scientific expeditions 

Sirera and Renn (2004) distinguish two different types of expeditions, or voyages, during the period 1770–1830, which they term "the Romantic period":

First are "expeditions financed by the States, closely related with the official scientific Institutions. characterised by having strict scientific objectives (and inspired by) the spirit of Illustration and progress". In this type of expedition, Sirera and Renn include the following travellers:
 J. Edens, whose 1715 ascent and observations of Mt. Teide influenced many subsequent expeditions.
 Louis Feuillée (1724), who was sent to measure the meridian of El Hierro and to map the islands.
 Jean-Charles de Borda (1771, 1776) who more accurately measured the longitudes of the islands and the height of Mount Teide
 the Baudin-Ledru expedition (1796) which aimed to recover a valuable collection of natural history objects.

The second type of expedition identified by Sirera and Renn is one that took place starting from more or less private initiatives. Among these, the key exponents were the following:
 Alexander von Humboldt (1799)
 Buch and Smith (1815)
 Broussonet
 Webb
 Sabin Berthelot.

Sirera and Renn identify the period 1770–1830 as one in which "In a panorama dominated until that moment by France and England enters with strength and brio Germany of the Romantic period whose presence in the islands will increase".

Early 20th century 

At the beginning of the 20th century, the British introduced a new cash-crop, the banana, the export of which was controlled by companies such as Fyffes.

30 November 1833 the Province of Canary Islands had been created with the capital being declared as Santa Cruz de Tenerife. The rivalry between the cities of Las Palmas de Gran Canaria and Santa Cruz de Tenerife for the capital of the islands led to the division of the archipelago into two provinces on 23 September 1927.

During the time of the Second Spanish Republic, Marxist and anarchist workers' movements began to develop, led by figures such as Jose Miguel Perez and Guillermo Ascanio. However, outside of a few municipalities, these organisations were a minority and fell easily to Nationalist forces during the Spanish Civil War.

Franco regime 

In 1936, Francisco Franco was appointed General Commandant of the Canaries. He joined the military revolt of 17 July which began the Spanish Civil War. Franco quickly took control of the archipelago, except for a few points of resistance on La Palma and in the town of Vallehermoso, on La Gomera. Though there was never a war in the islands, the post-war suppression of political dissent on the Canaries was most severe.

During the Second World War, Winston Churchill prepared plans for the British seizure of the Canary Islands as a naval base, in the event of Gibraltar being invaded from the Spanish mainland. The planned operation was known as Operation Pilgrim.

Opposition to Franco's regime did not begin to organise until the late 1950s, which experienced an upheaval of parties such as the Communist Party of Spain and the formation of various nationalist, leftist parties.

During the Ifni War, the Franco regime set up concentration camps on the islands to extrajudicially imprison those in Western Sahara suspected of disloyalty to Spain, many of whom were colonial troops recruited on the spot but were later deemed to be potential fifth columnists and deported to the Canary Islands. These camps were characterised by the use of forced labour for infrastructure projects and highly unsanitary conditions resulting in the widespread occurrence of tuberculosis.

Self-governance 

After the death of Franco, there was a pro-independence armed movement based in Algeria, the Movement for the Independence and Self-determination of the Canaries Archipelago (MAIAC). In 1968, the Organisation of African Unity recognized the MAIAC as a legitimate African independence movement, and declared the Canary Islands as an African territory still under foreign rule.

After the establishment of a democratic constitutional monarchy in Spain, autonomy was granted to the Canaries via a law passed in 1982, with a newly established autonomous devolved government and parliament. In 1983, the first autonomous elections were held. The Spanish Socialist Workers' Party (PSOE) won. In the 2007 elections, the PSOE gained a plurality of seats, but the nationalist Canarian Coalition and the conservative Partido Popular (PP) formed a ruling coalition government.

Capitals 

The political capital of the archipelago did not exist as such until the nineteenth century. The first cities founded by the Europeans at the time of the conquest of the Canary Islands in the 15th century were: Telde (in Gran Canaria), San Marcial del Rubicón (in Lanzarote) and Betancuria (in Fuerteventura). These cities boasted the first European institutions present in the archipelago, including Catholic bishoprics. Although, because the period of splendor of these cities developed before the total conquest of the archipelago and its incorporation into the Crown of Castile never had a political and real control of the entire Canary archipelago.

The function of a Canarian city with full jurisdiction for the entire archipelago only exists after the conquest of the Canary Islands, although originally de facto, that is, without legal and real meaning and linked to the headquarters of the Canary Islands General Captaincy.

Las Palmas de Gran Canaria was the first city that exercised this function. This is because the residence of the Captain General of the Canary Islands was in this city during part of the sixteenth and seventeenth centuries. In May 1661, the Captain General of the Canary Islands, Jerónimo de Benavente y Quiñones, moved the headquarters of the captaincy to the city of San Cristóbal de La Laguna on the island of Tenerife. This was due to the fact that this island since the conquest was the most populated, productive and with the highest economic expectations. La Laguna would be considered the de facto capital of the archipelago until the official status of the capital of Canary Islands in the city of Santa Cruz de Tenerife was confirmed in the 19th century, due in part to the constant controversies and rivalries between the bourgeoisies of San Cristóbal de La Laguna and Las Palmas de Gran Canaria for the economic, political and institutional hegemony of the archipelago.

Already in 1723, the Captain General of the Canary Islands Lorenzo Fernandez de Villavicencio had moved the headquarters of the General Captaincy of the Canary Islands from San Cristóbal de La Laguna to Santa Cruz de Tenerife. This decision continued without pleasing the society of the island of Gran Canaria. It would be after the creation of the Province of Canary Islands in November 1833 in which Santa Cruz would become the first fully official capital of the Canary Islands (De jure and not of de facto as happened previously). Santa Cruz de Tenerife would be the capital of the Canary archipelago until during the Government of General Primo de Rivera in 1927 the Province of Canary Islands was split in two provinces: Las Palmas with capital in Las Palmas de Gran Canaria, and Santa Cruz de Tenerife with capital in the homonymous city.

Finally, with the Statute of Autonomy of the Canary Islands in 1982 and the creation of the Autonomous Community of the Canary Islands, the capital of the archipelago between Las Palmas de Gran Canaria and Santa Cruz de Tenerife is fixed, which is how it remains today.

Demographics 

The Canary Islands have a population of 2,153,389 inhabitants (2019), making it the eighth most populous of Spain's autonomous communities.

The population of the islands according to the 2019 data are:
 Tenerife – 917,841
 Gran Canaria – 851,231
 Lanzarote – 152,289 (including the population of La Graciosa)
 Fuerteventura – 116,886
 La Palma – 82,671
 La Gomera – 21,503
 El Hierro – 10,968
The Canary Islands have become home to many European residents, mainly coming from Italy, Germany and the UK. Because of the vast immigration to Venezuela and Cuba during the second half of the 20th century and the later return to the Canary Islands of these people along with their families, there are many residents whose country of origin was Venezuela (66,593) or Cuba (41,807). Since the 1990s, many illegal migrants have reached the Canary Islands, Melilla and Ceuta, using them as entry points to the EU.

Religion 

The Catholic Church has been the majority religion in the archipelago for more than five centuries, ever since the Conquest of the Canary Islands. There are also several other religious communities.

Roman Catholic Church 
The overwhelming majority of native Canarians are Roman Catholic (76.7%) with various smaller foreign-born populations of other Christian beliefs such as Protestants.

The appearance of the Virgin of Candelaria (Patron of Canary Islands) was credited with moving the Canary Islands toward Christianity. Two Catholic saints were born in the Canary Islands: Peter of Saint Joseph de Betancur and José de Anchieta. Both born on the island of Tenerife, they were respectively missionaries in Guatemala and Brazil.

The Canary Islands are divided into two Catholic dioceses, each governed by a bishop:
 Diócesis Canariense: Includes the islands of the Eastern Province: Gran Canaria, Fuerteventura and Lanzarote. Its capital was San Marcial El Rubicón (1404) and Las Palmas de Gran Canaria (1483–present). There was a previous bishopric which was based in Telde, but it was later abolished.
 Diócesis Nivariense: Includes the islands of the western province: Tenerife, La Palma, La Gomera and El Hierro. Its capital is San Cristóbal de La Laguna (1819–present).

Other religions 
Separate from the overwhelming Christian majority are a minority of Muslims. Among the followers of Islam, the Islamic Federation of the Canary Islands exists to represent the Islamic community in the Canary Islands as well as to provide practical support to members of the Islamic community. For its part, there is also the Evangelical Council of the Canary Islands in the archipelago.

Other religious faiths represented include Jehovah's Witnesses, The Church of Jesus Christ of Latter-day Saints as well as Hinduism. Minority religions are also present such as the Church of the Guanche People which is classified as a neo-pagan native religion. Also present are Buddhism, Judaism, Baháʼí, African religion, and Chinese religions.

According to Statista in 2019, there are 75,662 Muslims in Canary Islands.

Statistics 
The distribution of beliefs in 2012 according to the CIS Barometer Autonomy was as follows:
 Catholic 84.9%
 Atheist/Agnostic/Unbeliever 12.3%
 Other religions 1.7%

Population genetics

Islands 
Ordered from west to east, the Canary Islands are El Hierro, La Palma, La Gomera, Tenerife, Gran Canaria, Fuerteventura, and Lanzarote. In addition, north of Lanzarote are the islets of La Graciosa, Montaña Clara, Alegranza, Roque del Este and Roque del Oeste, belonging to the Chinijo Archipelago, and northeast of Fuerteventura is the islet of Lobos. There are also a series of small adjacent rocks in the Canary Islands: the Roques de Anaga, Garachico and Fasnia in Tenerife, and those of Salmor and Bonanza in El Hierro.

El Hierro 

The whole island was declared Reserve of the Biosphere in 2000. Its capital is Valverde. Also known as Ferro, it was once believed to be the westernmost land in the world.

Fuerteventura 

It has been declared a biosphere reserve by UNESCO. It has a population of 113,275. The oldest of the islands, it is more eroded. Its capital is Puerto del Rosario.

Gran Canaria 

Gran Canaria has 846,717 inhabitants. The capital, Las Palmas de Gran Canaria (377,203 inhabitants), is the most populous city and shares the status of capital of the Canaries with Santa Cruz de Tenerife. Roque Nublo  and Pico de las Nieves ("Peak of Snow")  are located in the center of the island. On the south of the island are the Maspalomas Dunes (Gran Canaria).

La Gomera 

Geologically it is one of the oldest of the archipelago. The insular capital is San Sebastian de La Gomera. Garajonay National Park is located on the island.

Lanzarote 

Lanzarote is the easternmost island and one of the oldest of the archipelago, and it has shown evidence of recent volcanic activity. The capital is Arrecife, with 56,834 inhabitants.

Chinijo Archipelago 

The Chinijo Archipelago includes the islands La Graciosa, Alegranza, Montaña Clara, Roque del Este and Roque del Oeste. With , La Graciosa, is the largest island of the Chinijo Archipelago but also the smallest inhabited island of the Canaries.

La Palma 

For long it showed no signs of volcanic activity, even though the volcano Teneguía entered into eruption last in 1971. On September 19, 2021, the volcanic Cumbre Vieja on the island erupted. Santa Cruz de La Palma (known to those on the island as simply "Santa Cruz") is its capital.

Tenerife 

In addition, with 904,713 inhabitants it is the most populated island of the archipelago and Spain. Two of the islands' principal cities are located on it: the capital, Santa Cruz de Tenerife and San Cristóbal de La Laguna (a World Heritage Site). San Cristóbal de La Laguna, the second city of the island is home to the oldest university in the Canary Islands, the University of La Laguna. Teide, with its  is the highest peak of Spain and also a World Heritage Site. Tenerife is the site of the worst air disaster in the history of aviation, in which 583 people were killed in the collision of two Boeing 747s on 27 March 1977.

La Graciosa 

Graciosa Island or commonly La Graciosa is a volcanic island in the Canary Islands of Spain, located 2 km (1.2 mi) north of the island of Lanzarote across the Strait of El Río. It was formed by the Canary hotspot. The island is part of the Chinijo Archipelago and the Chinijo Archipelago Natural Park (Parque Natural del Archipiélago Chinijo). It is administrated by the municipality of Teguise. In 2018 La Graciosa officially became the eighth Canary Island. Before then, La Graciosa had the status of an islet, administratively dependent on the island of Lanzarote. It is the smallest and least populated of the main islands, with a population of about 700 people.

Data

Economy and environment 

The economy is based primarily on tourism, which makes up 32% of the GDP. The Canaries receive about 12 million tourists per year. Construction makes up nearly 20% of the GDP and tropical agriculture, primarily bananas and tobacco, are grown for export to Europe and the Americas. Ecologists are concerned that the resources, especially in the more arid islands, are being overexploited but there are still many agricultural resources like tomatoes, potatoes, onions, cochineal, sugarcane, grapes, vines, dates, oranges, lemons, figs, wheat, barley, maize, apricots, peaches and almonds.

Water resources are also being overexploited, due to the high water usage by tourists. Also, some islands (such as Gran Canaria and Tenerife) overexploit the ground water. This is done in such degree that, according to European and Spanish legal regulations, the current situation is not acceptable. To address the problems, good governance and a change in the water use paradigm have been proposed. These solutions depend largely on controlling water use and on demand management. As this is administratively difficult and politically unpalatable, most action is currently directed at increasing the public offer of water through import from outside; a decision which is economically, politically and environmentally questionable.

To bring in revenue for environmental protection, innovation, training and water sanitation a tourist tax was considered in 2018, along with a doubling of the ecotax and restrictions on holiday rents in the zones with the greatest pressure of demand.

The economy is € 25 billion (2001 GDP figures). The islands experienced continuous growth during a 20-year period, up until 2001, at a rate of approximately 5% annually. This growth was fueled mainly by huge amounts of foreign direct investment, mostly to develop tourism real estate (hotels and apartments), and European Funds (near €11 billion in the period from 2000 to 2007), since the Canary Islands are labelled Region Objective 1 (eligible for euro structural funds). Additionally, the EU allows the Canary Islands Government to offer special tax concessions for investors who incorporate under the Zona Especial Canaria (ZEC) regime and create more than five jobs.

Spain gave permission in August 2014 for Repsol and its partners to explore oil and natural gas prospects off the Canary Islands, involving an investment of €7.5 billion over four years, to commence at the end of 2016. Repsol at the time said the area could ultimately produce 100,000 barrels of oil a day, which would meet 10 percent of Spain's energy needs. However, the analysis of samples obtained did not show the necessary volume nor quality to consider future extraction, and the project was scrapped.

Despite currently having very high dependence on fossil fuels, research on the renewable energy potential concluded that a high potential for renewable energy technologies exists on the archipelago. This, in such extent even that a scenario pathway to 100% renewable energy supply by 2050 has been put forward.

The Canary Islands have great natural attractions, climate and beaches make the islands a major tourist destination, being visited each year by about 12 million people (11,986,059 in 2007, noting 29% of Britons, 22% of Spanish (from outside the Canaries), and 21% of Germans). Among the islands, Tenerife has the largest number of tourists received annually, followed by Gran Canaria and Lanzarote. The archipelago's principal tourist attraction is the Teide National Park (in Tenerife) where the highest mountain in Spain and third largest volcano in the world (Mount Teide), receives over 2.8 million visitors annually.

The combination of high mountains, proximity to Europe, and clean air has made the Roque de los Muchachos peak (on La Palma island) a leading location for telescopes like the Grantecan.

The islands, as an autonomous region of Spain, are in the European Union and the Schengen Area. They are in the European Union Customs Union but outside the VAT area. Instead of VAT there is a local Sales Tax (IGIC) which has a general rate of 7%, an increased tax rate of 13.5%, a reduced tax rate of 3% and a zero tax rate for certain basic need products and services. Consequently, some products are subject to additional VAT if being exported from the islands into mainland Spain or the rest of the EU.

Canarian time is Western European Time (WET) (or GMT; in summer one hour ahead of GMT). So Canarian time is one hour behind that of mainland Spain and the same as that of the UK, Ireland and mainland Portugal all year round.

Tourism statistics 
The number of tourists who visited the Canary Islands had been in 2018 16,150,054 and in the year 2019 15,589,290.

GDP statistics 
The figures by island are as follows:

Transport

Current fleet

The Canary Islands have eight airports altogether, two of the main ports of Spain, and an extensive network of autopistas (highways) and other roads. For a road map see multimap. Traffic congestion is sometimes a problem in Tenerife and on Grand Canaria.

Large ferry boats and fast ferries link most of the islands. Both types can transport large numbers of passengers, cargo, and vehicles. Fast ferries are made of aluminium and powered by modern and efficient diesel engines, while conventional ferries have a steel hull and are powered by heavy oil. A typical ferry ride between La Palma and Tenerife may take up to eight hours or more while a fast ferry takes about two and a half hours and between Tenerife and Gran Canaria can be about one hour.

The largest airport is the Gran Canaria Airport. Tenerife has two airports, Tenerife North Airport and Tenerife South Airport. The island of Tenerife gathers the highest passenger movement of all the Canary Islands through its two airports. The two main islands (Tenerife and Gran Canaria) receive the greatest number of passengers. Tenerife 6,204,499 passengers and Gran Canaria 5,011,176 passengers.

The port of Las Palmas is first in freight traffic in the islands, while the port of Santa Cruz de Tenerife is the first fishing port with approximately 7,500 tons of fish caught, according to the Spanish government publication Statistical Yearbook of State Ports. Similarly, it is the second port in Spain as regards ship traffic, only surpassed by the Port of Algeciras Bay. The port's facilities include a border inspection post (BIP) approved by the European Union, which is responsible for inspecting all types of imports from third countries or exports to countries outside the European Economic Area. The port of Los Cristianos (Tenerife) has the greatest number of passengers recorded in the Canary Islands, followed by the port of Santa Cruz de Tenerife. The Port of Las Palmas is the third port in the islands in passengers and first in number of vehicles transported.

The SS America was beached at the Canary islands on 18 January 1994. However, the ocean liner broke apart after the course of several years and eventually sank beneath the surface.

Rail transport 
The Tenerife Tram opened in 2007 and is currently the only one in the Canary Islands, travelling between the cities of Santa Cruz de Tenerife and San Cristóbal de La Laguna.

Three more railway lines are being planned for the Canary Islands:

Airports 
 Tenerife South Airport – Tenerife
 Tenerife North Airport – Tenerife
 César Manrique-Lanzarote Airport – Lanzarote
 Fuerteventura Airport – Fuerteventura
 Gran Canaria Airport – Gran Canaria
 La Palma Airport – La Palma
 La Gomera Airport – La Gomera
 El Hierro Airport – El Hierro

Ports 

 Port of Puerto del Rosario – Fuerteventura
 Port of Arrecife – Lanzarote
 Port of Playa Blanca—Lanzarote
 Port of Santa Cruz de La Palma – La Palma
 Port of San Sebastián de La Gomera – La Gomera
 Port of La Estaca – El Hierro
 Port of Las Palmas – Gran Canaria
 Port of Arinaga – Gran Canaria
 Port of Agaete – Gran Canaria
 Port of Los Cristianos – Tenerife
 Port of Santa Cruz de Tenerife – Tenerife
 Port of Garachico – Tenerife
 Port of Granadilla – Tenerife

Health 

The Servicio Canario de Salud is an autonomous body of administrative nature attached to the Ministry responsible for Health of the Government of the Canary Islands. The majority of the archipelago's hospitals belong to this organization:

 Hospital Nuestra Señora de los Reyes – El Hierro
 Hospital General de La Palma – La Palma
 Hospital Nuestra Señora de Guadalupe – La Gomera
 Hospital Universitario Nuestra Señora de Candelaria – Tenerife
 Hospital Universitario de Canarias – Tenerife
 Hospital del Sur de Tenerife – Tenerife
 Hospital del Norte de Tenerife – Tenerife
 Hospital Universitario de Gran Canaria Doctor Negrín – Gran Canaria
 Hospital Universitario Insular de Gran Canaria – Gran Canaria
 Hospital General de Lanzarote Doctor José Molina Orosa – Lanzarote
 Hospital General de Fuerteventura – Fuerteventura

Wildlife

Extinct fauna 

The Canary Islands were previously inhabited by a variety of endemic animals, such as extinct giant lizards (Gallotia goliath), giant tortoises (Centrochelys burchardi and C. vulcanica), and Tenerife and Gran Canaria giant rats (Canariomys bravoi and C. tamarani),  among others. Extinct birds known only from Pleistocene and Holocene age bones include the Canary Islands quail (Coturnix gomerae), Dune shearwater (Puffinus holeae), Lava shearwater (P. olsoni), Trias greenfinch (Chloris triasi), Slender-billed greenfinch (C. aurelioi) and the Long-legged bunting (Emberiza alcoveri).

Current fauna 

The bird life includes European and African species, such as the black-bellied sandgrouse, Canary, Graja, a subspecies of red-billed chough endemic to La Palma, Gran Canaria blue chaffinch, Tenerife blue chaffinch, Canary Islands chiffchaff, Fuerteventura chat, Tenerife goldcrest, La Palma chaffinch, Canarian Egyptian vulture, Bolle's pigeon, Laurel pigeon, Plain swift, and Houbara bustard.

Terrestrial fauna includes the El Hierro giant lizard, La Gomera giant lizard, and the La Palma giant lizard. Mammals include the Canarian shrew, Canary big-eared bat, the Algerian hedgehog, and the more recently introduced mouflon.

Marine life 

The marine life found in the Canary Islands is also varied, being a combination of North Atlantic, Mediterranean and endemic species. In recent years, the increasing popularity of both scuba diving and underwater photography have provided biologists with much new information on the marine life of the islands.

Fish species found in the islands include many species of shark, ray, moray eel, bream, jack, grunt, scorpionfish, triggerfish, grouper, goby, and blenny. In addition, there are many invertebrate species, including sponge, jellyfish, anemone, crab, mollusc, sea urchin, starfish, sea cucumber and coral.

There are a total of five different species of marine turtle that are sighted periodically in the islands, the most common of these being the endangered loggerhead sea turtle. The other four are the green sea turtle, hawksbill sea turtle, leatherback sea turtle and Kemp's ridley sea turtle. Currently, there are no signs that any of these species breed in the islands, and so those seen in the water are usually migrating. However, it is believed that some of these species may have bred in the islands in the past, and there are records of several sightings of leatherback sea turtle on beaches in Fuerteventura, adding credibility to the theory.

Marine mammals include the large varieties of cetaceans including rare and not well-known species (see more details in the Marine life of the Canary Islands). Hooded seals have also been known to be vagrant in the Canary Islands every now and then. The Canary Islands were also formerly home to a population of the rarest pinniped in the world, the Mediterranean monk seal.

Native flora gallery

Holidays 

Some holidays of those celebrated in the Canary Islands are international and national, others are regional holidays and others are of insular character. The official day of the autonomous community is Canary Islands Day on 30 May. The anniversary of the first session of the Parliament of the Canary Islands, based in the city of Santa Cruz de Tenerife, held on 30 May 1983, is commemorated with this day.

The common festive calendar throughout the Canary Islands is as follows:

In addition, each of the islands has an island festival, in which it is a holiday only on that specific island. These are the festivities of island patrons saints of each island. Organized chronologically are:

The most famous festivals of the Canary Islands is the carnival. It is the most famous and international festival of the archipelago. The carnival is celebrated in all the islands and all its municipalities, perhaps the two busiest are those of the two Canarian capitals; the Carnival of Santa Cruz de Tenerife (Tourist Festival of International Interest) and the Carnival of Las Palmas de Gran Canaria. It is celebrated on the streets between the months of February and March. But the rest of the islands of the archipelago have their carnivals with their own traditions among which stand out: The Festival of the Carneros of El Hierro, the Festival of the Diabletes of Teguise in Lanzarote, Los Indianos de La Palma, the Carnival of San Sebastián de La Gomera and the Carnival of Puerto del Rosario in Fuerteventura.

Science and technology

In the 1960s, Gran Canaria was selected as the location for one of the 14 ground stations in the Manned Space Flight Network (MSFN) to support the NASA space program. Maspalomas Station, located in the south of the island, took part in a number of space missions including the Apollo 11 Moon landings and Skylab. Today it continues to support satellite communications as part of the ESA network.

Because of the remote location, a number of astronomical observatories are located in the archipelago, including the Teide Observatory on Tenerife, the Roque de los Muchachos Observatory on La Palma, and the Temisas Astronomical Observatory on Gran Canaria.

Tenerife is the home of the Instituto de Astrofísica de Canarias (Astrophysical Institute of the Canaries). There is also an Instituto de Bio-Orgánica Antonio González (Antonio González Bio-Organic Institute) at the University of La Laguna. Also at that university are the Instituto de Lingüística Andrés Bello (Andrés Bello Institute of Linguistics), the Centro de Estudios Medievales y Renacentistas (Center for Medieval and Renaissance Studies), the Instituto Universitario de la Empresa (University Institute of Business), the Instituto de Derecho Regional (Regional Institute of Law), the Instituto Universitario de Ciencias Políticas y Sociales (University Institute of Political and Social Sciences) and the Instituto de Enfermedades Tropicales (Institute of Tropical Diseases). The latter is one of the seven institutions of the Red de Investigación de Centros de Enfermedades Tropicales (RICET, "Network of Research of Centers of Tropical Diseases"), located in various parts of Spain. The Instituto Volcanológico de Canarias (Volcanological Institute of the Canary Islands) is based in Tenerife.

Sports 

A unique form of wrestling known as Canarian wrestling (lucha canaria) has opponents stand in a special area called a "terrero" and try to throw each other to the ground using strength and quick movements.

Another sport is the "game of the sticks" (palo canario) where opponents fence with long sticks. This may have come about from the shepherds of the islands who would challenge each other using their long walking sticks.

Furthermore, there is the shepherd's jump (salto del pastor). This involves using a long stick to vault over an open area. This sport possibly evolved from the shepherd's need to occasionally get over an open area in the hills as they were tending their sheep.

The two main football teams in the archipelago are: the CD Tenerife (founded in 1912) and UD Las Palmas (founded in 1949). As of the 2018/2019 season, both Tenerife and Las Palmas play in Segunda División. When in the same division, the clubs contest the Canary Islands derby. There are smaller clubs also playing in the mainland Spanish football league system, most notably UD Lanzarote and CD Laguna, although no other Canarian clubs have played in the top flight.

The mountainous terrain of the Canary Islands also caters to the growing popularity of ultra running and ultramarathons as host of annual competitive long-distance events including CajaMar Tenerife Bluetrail on Tenerife, Transvulcania on La Palma, Transgrancanaria on Gran Canaria, and the Half Marathon des Sables on Fuerteventura. A yearly Ironman Triathlon has been taking place on Lanzarote since 1992.

Notable athletes 
 Paco Campos, (1916–1995); a footballer who played as a forward. With 127 goals, 120 of which were for Atlético Madrid, he is the highest scoring player from the Canary Islands in La Liga.
 Nicolás García Hemme, born 20 June 1988 in Las Palmas de Gran Canaria, Canary Islands, 2012 London Olympics, Taekwondo Silver Medalist in Men's Welterweight category (−80 kg).
 Alfredo Cabrera, (1881–1964); shortstop for the St. Louis Cardinals in 1913
 Sergio Rodríguez, born in San Cristóbal de La Laguna in 1986, played point guard for the Portland Trail Blazers, Sacramento Kings, and New York Knicks.
 David Silva, born in Arguineguín in 1986, plays association football for Real Sociedad, member of the 2010 FIFA World Cup champion Spain national football team
 Juan Carlos Valerón, born in Arguineguín in 1975, played association football for Deportivo la Coruna and Las Palmas.
 Pedro, born in Santa Cruz de Tenerife in 1987, plays association football for Lazio, member of the 2010 FIFA World Cup champion Spain national football team
 Carla Suárez Navarro, born in Las Palmas de Gran Canaria in 1988, professional tennis player
 Paola Tirados, born in Las Palmas de Gran Canaria in 1980, synchronized swimmer, who participated in the Olympic Games of 2000, 2004 and 2008. She won the silver medal in Beijing in 2008 in the team competition category.
 Jesé, born in Las Palmas de Gran Canaria in 1993, plays association football for Las Palmas.
 Christo Bezuidenhout, born in Tenerife in 1970, played rugby union for Gloucester and South Africa.
 Pedri, born in Tegueste in 2002, plays association football for Barcelona.

See also

History 
 Battle of Santa Cruz de Tenerife (1797)
 First Battle of Acentejo
 Pyramids of Güímar
 Second Battle of Acentejo
 Tanausu
 Tenerife airport disaster; the deadliest commercial aviation disaster in history.

Geography 
 Cumbre Vieja, a volcano on La Palma
 Guatiza (Lanzarote)
 La Matanza de Acentejo
 Los Llanos de Aridane
 Orotava Valley
 San Andrés
Islands of Macaronesia
Azores
Madeira
Cabo Verde

Culture 
 Canarian cuisine
 Canarian Spanish
 Religion in Canary Islands
 Isleños
 Military of the Canary Islands
 Music of the Canary Islands
 Silbo Gomero, a whistled language, is an indigenous variant of Spanish
 Tortilla canaria
 Virgin of Candelaria (Patron saint of Canary Islands)

References

Notes

Citations

References 
 Alfred Crosby, Ecological Imperialism: The Biological Expansion of Europe, 900–1900 (Cambridge University Press) 
 Felipe Fernández-Armesto, The Canary Islands after the Conquest: The Making of a Colonial Society in the Early-Sixteenth Century, Oxford U. Press, 1982. ; 
 Sergio Hanquet, Diving in Canaries, Litografía A. ROMERO, 2001. 
 Martin Wiemers: The butterflies of the Canary Islands. – A survey on their distribution, biology and ecology (Lepidoptera: Papilionoidea and Hesperioidea) – Linneana Belgica 15 (1995): 63–84 & 87–118

Further reading 
 
 
 
 *

External links 

 Canary Islands Government
 Official Tourism Website of the Canary Islands

 
Archipelagoes of Spain
Autonomous communities of Spain
Archipelagoes of Africa
North Africa
NUTS 1 statistical regions of the European Union
NUTS 2 statistical regions of the European Union
Outermost regions of the European Union
Physiographic sections